Triple M Bendigo (official callsign: 3BBO) is a commercial radio station owned and operated by Southern Cross Austereo as part of the Triple M network. The station is broadcast to Central Victoria from studios in the Bendigo suburb of Golden Square.

The station commenced broadcasting in 1931 as 3BO, initially on the AM band at a frequency of 970 kilohertz, before converting to the FM band as 3BO FM on 5 April 1993. On 15 December 2016, the station was relaunched as Triple M.

Programming
Local programming is produced and broadcast from the station's Golden Square studios from 6am–12pm weekdays. The station's local output consists of a three-hour breakfast show presented by Bryan Coghlan and Kylie Stevenson

Networked programming originates from studios in Townsville, the Gold Coast, Melbourne and Sydney.

References

External links

Mainstream rock radio stations in Australia
Radio stations established in 1931
Radio stations in Bendigo
Bendigo